Judo is an event at the Asian Games since 1986 in Seoul, South Korea.

Editions

Medal table

List of medalists

External links
Medallists from previous Asian Games - Judo

 
Asian Games
Asian Games
Sports at the Asian Games
Games